iGo to Japan is a 2008 television film, the first made as part of the Nickelodeon TV series iCarly. It premiered on November 8, 2008, on Nickelodeon, and November 21 on YTV. It has also been broadcast as three episodes of the second season. The television movie stars Miranda Cosgrove, Jennette McCurdy, Nathan Kress, Jerry Trainor, and Mary Scheer. The film was directed by Steve Hoefer. The production of the film began in the spring of 2008, and lasted around 4 to 5 weeks.

Plot
The iCarly gang are invited to Tokyo after being nominated for the annual iWeb Awards, where in order to qualify they will be expected to perform a skit live on stage. Prior to their trip, they create a sketch called Melanie Higgles: Space Cheerleader to compete in the show.

They receive three first-class tickets. Freddie’s mother, Marissa, initially refuses to allow Freddie to go on the trip even after Spencer volunteers to chaperone the kids. She agrees instead to come along, despite Sam's initial objections. Since they do not have enough airline tickets for five people, Spencer trades the three first-class tickets for five lower-class ones. However, he subsequently calls in a favor from his best friend, Socko, which results in the team riding to Japan aboard an unsanitary, possum-filled cargo airplane bound for Korea. To their horror, they realize they must skydive into Tokyo.

The group winds up landing in a deserted area, but are found by a Japanese policeman who brings them safely to Hotel Nakamura, where they would be staying. After checking in and sleeping off their jet lag, which lasts into the next day, they are visited by Kyoko and Yûki, the stars of a competing webshow. The pair give Spencer and Marissa free passes to a Nakamura Spa where their cousins work and take Carly, Sam and Freddie shopping.

As generous as their gestures seem, Kyoko and Yûki have their minds set on sabotaging any chance that iCarly has of winning the iWeb Awards. They purposely fight over and over again for directions until Yûki "admits" they are lost. As night falls, they take Carly, Sam and Freddie to the middle of nowhere on a highway outside Tokyo and drive off after staging a kung-fu fight. Meanwhile, Spencer and Marissa find themselves bound to their massage tables by seaweed naked, a problem rectified by Spencer eating his way out and then freeing Marissa. Marissa locates the lost iCarly gang on a locator chip she had secretly put in Freddie's head.

Eventually, the gang reunites and are able to get to the iWeb Awards show, only to be prevented from entering the studio because the security guards cannot speak a word of English. The gang tearfully gives up, but Marissa distracts the guards and they get in, only to be quickly apprehended. The guards keep them in a utility room and Carly and Sam try to communicate with them by acting out what happened to them during their trip. Freddie cleverly videotapes them and plugs his camcorder into the stage's jumbotron. Unbeknownst to the girls, their manic performance is being broadcast to the audience, completely overshadowing Kyoko and Yûki's performance, as well as exposing their crimes. They are saved by Theodore Wilkins, the British man who invited them, who in fluent Japanese, informs the somewhat regretful security guards that they were supposed to be on the show.

iCarly wins the award for best comedy, though Carly and Sam have no idea how they won until Freddie explains what he did, while Kyoko and Yûki are arrested. The iCarly gang, along with Spencer and Marissa, return to America on a fishing boat, much to their dismay. Since Spencer believed that the Japanese soap was candy, they put some in their mouths before spitting it out in disgust.

Cast
 Miranda Cosgrove as Carly Shay: Star of her own web show titled iCarly, and Spencer’s younger sister.
 Jennette McCurdy as Sam Puckett: Co-host of the web show, and Carly’s delinquent sidekick and troublemaking best friend.
 Nathan Kress as Freddie Benson: Technical producer and director of iCarly. He is also the techy, geeky neighbor of Carly and Spencer.
 Jerry Trainor as Spencer Shay: Carly's older brother, and a skilled artist. He is also Carly’s legal guardian. In the movie, he tries to learn Japanese but every time he gets something wrong, a magnetic collar he wears shocks him.
 Mary Scheer as Marissa Benson: Freddie's mother. In the movie, she (along with Spencer) is trapped in seaweed while getting a massage.
 Ally Matsumura as Kyoko: The star of a competing webshow from Japan.
 Harry Shum Jr. as Yûki: Another star of a competing webshow from Japan.
 Jonathan Mangum as Henri P'Twa: a webshow host from France. He also competes.
 Michael Butler Murray as Theodore Wilkins: The chairman of the iWeb Awards. He speaks English and Japanese.
 Don Stark as Freight Dog: A man who flies the gang to Japan on his cargo plane with many possums bound for Korea.
 Andrew Kishino as Japanese Voice
 Jeremy Rowley as Lewbert: The obnoxious doorman of Bushwell Plaza in Seattle, Washington.
 Good Charlotte as themselves: They perform as guests at the iWeb Awards.
 Caine Sheppard as Carly's friend.
 Cyro Smith as Carly's grandfather.

Reception
The movie special received some positive notice. Verne Gay of Newsday rated it a 'B−'.

Nielsen ratings

References

External links
 
 

2008 television films
2008 films
ICarly
Nickelodeon original films
Films set in Tokyo
Television episodes set in Tokyo
Japan in non-Japanese culture
Films directed by Steve Hoefer
2000s English-language films